Paul Gardy was Général de brigade of the French Army and Commandant of the Foreign Legion in 1951 and 1958.

Military career

Saint-Cyrien of the 108th promotion ("du Souvenir" - "of Memory" promotion), sous-lieutenant Gardy, graduated Saint-Cyr in 1923, passed a year of application at Saumur, then joined the 8th Hussards Regiment. Promoted to lieutenant, he was designated for the Levant in September 1925 and was assigned at his request, to the 4th squadron of the 1st Foreign Cavalry Regiment 1er REC, with whom he took part to the columns of Hermon. He distinguished himself notably during mounting the defensive of the citadel of Rashaya. Wounded twice, he was cited at the orders of the armed forces and evacuated.

Assigned temporarily at the 12th Cuirassiers Regiment, he returned in 1926 to the 1st squadron of the 1st Foreign Cavalry Regiment 1e REC, in the region of Euphrate.
With his unit, he was sent to Bou Denib in Morocco in 1927, then to Sousse in Tunisia in August 1928. In June 1929, lieutenant Gardy passed to the 3rd squadron with whom he redeployed to Morocco, Rich circle.
He was later detached to the 37th Aviation Regiment, at the squadron of Ouarzazate, with whom he operated in Central Atlas, Sagho and Draa. 
he obtained two citations and was made a chevalier of the Légion d'honneur.

In 1931, he was assigned to the 1st African Chasseur Regiment, then to the 3rd Hussards. 
In 1932–1933, he pursued the course of an instructor lieutenant at Saumur, then joined the 1st Foreign Cavalry Regiment 1er REC at Sousse in October 1933, where he assumed the command of the 1st squadron.

Captain in October 1934, he left the 1st Foreign Cavalry Regiment 1er REC in 1938 to join the war school after a short passage at the 2nd Mounted Dragoon Battalion.

He took part in the campaign of 1939–1940 at the general staff headquarters of the 20th Infantry Division, where he received a citation in June 1940. 
He joined quickly North Africa where he was assigned to the 4th Tunisian Saphis Regiment. Chef d'escadron in June 1941, he commanded the second squadron group of this regiment and took part to the campaign in Tunisia where he was cited at the orders of the armed forces.

He was then designated as chief of the bureau of the 1re DB as of July 1943. Designated second in command of the 2nd African Chasseur Regiment in April 1944, he participated with this regiment to the campaign of France where he distinguished capability in the offensive of Hautes Alsace. Wounded twice, he was cited at the orders of the armed forces and promoted to officier of the Légion d'honneur.

Lieutenant-colonel in January 1945, he was designated as an instructor at the general staff headquarter school, then attached to the military cabinet of general Kœnig at Baden-Baden.

As of March 1946, he commanded the 1st Cuirassiers Regiment at Neustadt. Colonel on 1 October 1947, he assumed in June 1948 the functions of chief of the general staff headquarters of the 1re DB, which he conserved until February 1951.

He was designated accordingly as commandant of the subdivision of Tours. He received the commandeur degree of the Légion d'honneur.

Designated as second commandant in command of the Autonomous Group Tenure of the Foreign Legion at Sidi-Bel-Abbes on 15 September 1951, he assumed tenure commandment on 1 October 1951, succeeding général Jean Olié.

In 1955, he joined Germany as deputy to the général commandant of the 1re DB.

Promoted to Général de brigade in 1957, he was designated as Inspector of the Foreign Legion on 31 July 1958.

He participated the preparation and realization of the 1961 general's putsch and joined général Raoul Salan at the corps of the Organisation armée sécrete (OAS) and took charge of the region of Alger then Oran where he remained until the end of June 1962.

Général Paul Gardy was condemned in absentia on 11 July 1961.

Grand Officier of the Legion of Honour, Général Paul Gardy died accidentally in Argentina, where he exiled himself.

Recognitions and Honors 

  Grand Officier of the Légion d'Honneur
  Commandeur of the Légion d'Honneur
  Officier of the Légion d'Honneur
  Chevalier of the Légion d'Honneur

See also
French Foreign Legion Music Band (MLE)
René Lennuyeux
Pierre Jeanpierre
Jacques Lefort
Pierre Darmuzai
Saharan Méharistes Companies (méharistes sahariennes)
1st Foreign Parachute Regiment
Hélie de Saint Marc
Roger Faulques
Christian Piquemal

References

Sources 
Répertoire des chefs de corps
Centre de documentation de la Légion étrangère
Répertoire des citations (BCAAM)

1901 births
1975 deaths
Members of the Organisation armée secrète